Ma'ayan Harod or Ayn Jalut (lit.

Its traditional name, Ain Jalut, has been recorded since the 12th century; the name Jalut means "Goliath". In the 1920s it was Hebraized as "Ein Harod" after the land was purchased in the Sursock Purchases, following a connection to the biblical "Ein Harod" (Book of ) made as early as 1856 by Arthur Penrhyn Stanley, who later became Dean of Westminster and a co-founder of the Palestine Exploration Fund. In addition to the connection to the Biblical events of Goliath's death and Gideon's defeat of the Midianites, it has also been proposed as the location of Saul's defeat at the hands of the Philistines; scholarly discussion continues and none of these identifications can be certain.

A small Palestinian village was established in the area in the late 19th century; according to medieval chronicler Baha ad-Din ibn Shaddad there had been a prosperous village there in the Middle Ages.

The spring is also known as Gideon's Fountain, and emerges from a cave known today as "Gideon's Cave" on the foothills of Mount Gilboa. Today the spring is part of the Ma'ayan Harod National Park, administered by the Israel Nature and Parks Authority.

Geography 

The spring is located in the Harod Valley, which is the eastern part of the Jezreel Valley. While the Jezreel Valley is drained via the Kishon River to the Mediterranean Sea, the Harod Valley is drained through the Harod Stream ("Wadi Jalud" in Arabic) to the Jordan River. It is the largest of the springs emerging on the northern slopes of Mount Gilboa. The source of the spring as well as other springs in the Beit She'an Valley to the east, comes from fresh rainwater that percolate into the limestone hills of Samaria and collect in an underground water reservoir beneath the areas of the Palestinian cities of Nablus and Jenin. The water emerges from the hills as they incline north towards the valleys. At this valley the waters emerge from a natural cave known as "Gideon's Cave". The spring's discharge rate is about 360 cubic meters per hour. According to the PEF's  Survey of Western Palestine in  1882, Victor Guérin stated that the rock from which the fountain springs has been artificially hollowed into a cavern.

Identification

Origin of the name "Salut/Jalud" 
The spring is first mentioned in the 12th century by the name Ain Jalut, meaning "Spring of Goliath". The origin of this name is believed to be in a legend, that the biblical battle between David and Goliath took place in this area. An anonymous Christian traveler from Burdigala mentioned in the year 333/334, a place near the city of Jezreel where biblical David killed Goliath. Zev Vilnay has mentioned a Kurdish-Jewish folklore song which puts the location of the battle at the "fields of Megiddo", in the Jezreel Valley. In the 14th century, Ishtori Haparchi, who lived in the region, has dismissed the connection of the spring to Goliath, as the biblical battle took place between Sokho and Azekah, located in Judea and not in the Jezreel Valley.

Identification of the spring with "Spring in Jezreel" 
Haparchi instead identifies the spring with the biblical "Spring which is in Jezreel", where Israelite king Saul prepared his army before the Battle of Gilboa, in which he and his son were killed. The identification with the "Spring which is in Jezreel" was followed by Edward Robinson and Eli Smith, who wrote in their 1841 book Biblical Researches in Palestine "There is every reason to regard this as the ancient fountain of Jezreel, where Saul and Jonathan pitched before their last fatal battle;...". This identification was repeated by Arthur Penrhyn Stanley in 1856 and Victor Guérin who explained in 1874 that although there is a spring closer to the ancient city of Jezreel, the spring in Ain Jalut is much larger and is therefore more likely to be the spring where Saul set his military camp. This identification was rejected by John Wilson in 1847, who identified the "fountain of Jezreel" at a location closer to the ancient city, known today as Ein Jezreel. Gidi Yahalom explained in an article in 2015 that the actual reason for the identification of the Spring in Jezreel in Ain Jalut and not in Ein Jezreel (known in Arabic as "Ain al-Metiyeh", the "Dying Spring"), is the small size of the Ein Jezreel in comparison to the Ain Jalut. The spring often dries and Yahalom believes that the scholars identified the Spring in Jezreel with Ain Jalut probably visited in years when the spring of Ein Jezreel was dry.

Identification with "Ein Harod" 
Besides the "Spring which is in Jezreel", Guérin and Stanley also identified the spring with "Ein Harod", mentioned in the Book of Judges, in the context of Gideon and his battle with the Midianites. This identification was repeated by Henry Ridgeway in his 1876 book "The Lord's land". Ein Harod was also identified with Ain Jalut by the Encyclopaedia Biblica in 1903. George Adam Smith followed the identification with Ein Harod in 1920, but identified the "fountain which is in Jezreel" in Ein Ganim (Jenin), on the other side of Mount Gilboa. He suggested that "Jezreel" in that context wasn't the city but the name of the district in which the biblical spring was located.

Gidi Yahalom claimed in 2015 that the name "Jalut" is a corruption of the name "Gilead", which means a "heap of stones". In Book of Joshua 7:3, Gideon addresses his men and call all fighters who "tremble with fear" to stand and watch from "Mount Gilead". Yahalom states that from the Gilead Mountains in Transjordan the battle could not be seen, so this place should be elsewhere. He mentioned an archaeological discovery in Mount Saul, one of the Gilboa's peaks south of the spring. A stone structure, fitting to description of a "Gilead" (8 meters/26 feet wide, 10 meters/32 feet long) with traces of human presence from the Paleolithic (Stone Age) to Roman times. Therefore, the place might have been known as Ein Gilead, and thus became Ain Jalut or Jalud (as "t" and "d" often interchange in Arabic). As for the name Harod, Yahalom suggest that the meaning of Ein Harod is "Spring of Gathering", as words from the root H-R-D are used in the bible to refer to gathering, especially in times of war. The record of three other major biblical or historical battles taking place in this specific region supports this theory.

In 1882, Claude Reignier Conder identified in  the "Well of Harod" in a different place called 'Ain el Jemain, in the nearby Beit She'an valley.

An article published by Israel Finkelstein and Oded Lipschits in 2017 rejects the identification of Ein Harod in Ain Jalut, as they claim the biblcal battle actually took place near Shechem (modern day Nablus), after which the Israelites chased the Midianites to Succoth which is east of the Jordan River. They mention Josephus who puts the location of the battle next to the Jordan River in his 1st century CE book Antiquities of the Jews.

Modern scholarship remains divided on the identification of the site.

Byzantine, Crusader, Ayyubid and Mamluk periods 
The Itinerarium Burdigalense (586) notes "ibi est campus, ubi David Goliat occidit" in reference to a location just before Scythopolis.

In the 12th century, a village or a town existed next to the spring and bore its name. Baha ad-Din ibn Shaddad, in his Life of Saladin, wrote that "The Sultan continued his march to el-Jalut, a prosperous village, near which there is a spring (ain), and here he pitched his camp". Yaqut al-Hamawi mentions Ain Jalut as "a small and pleasant town, lying between Nablus and Baisan, in the Filastin Province. The place was taken by the Rumi (Crusaders), and retaken by Saladin in 579 (1183 CE)." An archaeological survey conducted in the 20th century in search of the settlement did not find any settlement in the immediate vicinity of the spring, although two settlement sites were discovered in the adjacent community settlement of Gidona and the nearby Giv'at Yehonatan ("Jonathan's Hill"). In the immediate vicinity of the spring the surveyors did find flour mills, the remains of an aqueduct which are both dated to Islamic times (either before or after the Crusades). The surveyors also found a burial tomb and the remains of an oil press.

In the Battle of Ain Jalut in 1260, the Mamluks defeated the Mongol army of Hulagu Khan which was under the command of Kitbuqa.

Palestinian Arab Village 

Sometime after the Sursock family bought the land from the Ottoman government in 1872, they established a small village here.

The area was acquired by the Jewish community as part of the Sursock Purchase. In 1921, when the land was sold by the Sursocks, the nine families who lived here petitioned the new British administration for perpetual ownership, but were only offered a short lease with an option to buy.

Jewish settlement of Ein Harod 

The modern Israeli villages (kibbutzim) of Ein Harod (Ihud) and Ein Harod (Meuhad) began in a temporary farm and settlement established next to the spring. In the early 20th century the spring and the surrounding area were owned by the Sursock family from Beirut (modern-day Lebanon). In 1920, the Zionist activist Yehoshua Hankin, through the Palestine Land Development Company, purchased the territory, named the "Nuris Bloc", after a nearby Arab village, and compensated the 38 tenant farmers who lived there.

In 1921, Hankin sent members of Gdud HaAvoda, a Zionist work group, to settle in the territory. Shlomo Lavi, among the leaders of the Gdud, had envisioned the "Big Kvutza", a settlement consisting of several farms spread on vast terrain with both agriculture and industry. His plan was approved by the World Zionist Organization, but with some limitations on his detailed vision. The Gdud began this settlement near the Ain Jalut which was known to Jews as Ein Harod. Yehuda Kopolevitz Almog, one of the Gdud's leaders, describes that in the first day the settlers set up tents and began enclosing their camp with barbwire and defensive trenches.

The first 74 members pioneers were split into two groups. One of the Second Aliyah, former members of Hashomer and Kvutzat Kinneret, and the other from the Third Aliyah. In the first months, the settlers sowed fields, planted a eucalyptus grove, paved roads and dried swamps. An Ulpan, a school for learning Hebrew was set up in the camp. In December 1921, a second farm called Tel Yosef (after Joseph Trumpeldor) was established by members of the Gdud on the hill of Qumya. Disagreements on funds and internal politics have led Ein Harod and Tel Yosef to part ways in 1923, with many members leaving the former for the latter. The group that remained in Ein Harod included 110 members and was headed by Lavi, Yitzhak Tabenkin, Aharon Zisling and David Maletz. The group at Ein Harod continued to get little support from the Zionist organizations and after the 1929 Palestine riots, the members chose to move their camp from the area of the spring to the hill of Qumya, next to Tel Yosef and thus the settlement at the spring was abandoned.

The spring continued to be used as a camp site for the pioneers of Beit HaShita and Dovrat before their departure to their permanent locations. In 1949 a village named Gidona was established  next to the spring for Jewish immigratns from Yemen.

House and tomb of Yehoshua Hankin 

Yehoshua Hankin purchased lands and built a home in the valley with his wife Olga. Their house was planned as a bauhaus and construction began in the 1930s just above the spring. Pioneers of Beit HaShita who camped at the spring helped the construction. Olga got sick and passed away in 1942. Yehoshua decided to bury his wife next to the house in a tomb inspired by the ancient Roman-Jewish tombs in Beit She'arim (Roman-era Jewish village). Hankin died in 1945 and was buried next to his wife. The tomb's entrance was designed by Israeli artists David Palombo, who designed the gates of the Knesset. For some years the tomb was a pilgrimage site for women hoping to get pregnant.

For another house of Hankins, see Giv'at Olga#Beit Olga Hankin

Israeli national park
The well is now at the heart of a national park called Ma'ayan Ḥarod. The spring water is used to feed a recreational swimming pool. The house of Hankin has become a museum showing historical artifacts and life-size mannequins of the couple Hankin. Next to the museum is a war memorial for residents of the valley who died in Israel's wars. Next to the park is a Hostelling International youth hostel.

Legacy of Ain Jalut
One of the three original brigades of the Palestine Liberation Army was named "Ain Jalut", after the battle. In July 1970, Yasser Arafat referred to the modern area in the context of the historical battle:
   
This will not be the first time that our people has vanquished its enemies. The Mongols came and swept away the Abbasid caliphate, then they came to Ain Jalut in our land – in the same region where we are today fighting the Zionists – and they were defeated at Ain Jalut.

Citations

General and cited references 

 
 
 
  (p. 116)
  (pp. 308-310)

External links
 Survey of Western Palestine (SWP), Map 9: IAA, Wikimedia commons

Springs of Israel
Hebrew Bible places
Gilboa Regional Council
National parks of Israel
Disputed Biblical places
Goliath
Gilead